Coniarthonia is a genus of lichenized fungi in the family Arthoniaceae.

References

Arthoniaceae
Lichen genera
Arthoniomycetes genera